S.C. Eintracht is an amateur American soccer team founded in 1933 which plays in the Cosmopolitan Soccer League.

Founded by German immigrants in Astoria, Queens, and known at times as New York Eintracht, the team entered the German American Soccer League in 1933.  In 1943, it won the first of four straight league titles.  Its last league title came in 1950.  Eintracht won the 1944 and 1945 National Amateur Cup as well as the 1955 National Challenge Cup.  Eintracht also won the Dr. Manning Cup, the Eastern New York State Soccer Association championship, in 1943, 1945, 1946 and 1953.  During the 2010–2011 season, they played in the CSL Metro 2 Division.

References

External links
 SPOTLIGHT ON S.C. EINTRACHT: CSL club celebrates its 75th anniversary

Men's soccer clubs in New York (state)
1933 establishments in New York City
Eintracht